Elkem is a company that produces silicones, silicon, alloys for the foundry industry, carbon and microsilica, and other materials. Elkem was founded in 1904, has more than 7,000 employees and fields 30 production sites worldwide. Elkem has an operating income of NOK 33.7 billion. Elkem is responsible for a total of 2.52 million tonnes of scope 1 emissions in 2021. Elkem is listed on the Oslo Stock Exchange (ticker: ELK).

History
Elkem was founded in 1904 by the industrial entrepreneur Sam Eyde  (1866 – 1940). He named the company Det Norske Aktieselskap for Elektrokemisk Industri (Elektrokemisk), and the goal was to create an international industry company based on Norwegian natural resources. In 1917 a ferroalloy plant was acquired and Elkem started production of the Söderberg electrode.

Throughout the 1960s and beyond Elkem expanded, primarily in Norway within aluminium, mining and finished products. In 1972 the company merged with Christiania Spigerverk and continued with an international expansion within ferroalloys and steel. In 1981-84 Elkem acquired Union Carbides plants in Norway and North America and in 1986 the plants at Thamshavn and Bjølvefossen. In the 2000s Elkem had acquired Icelandic Alloy, Remi Claeys Aluminium and Sapa.

In January 2011 Orkla ASA signed a binding agreement with China National Bluestar Group to sell Elkem, including Elkem Silicon Materials, Elkem Foundry Products, Elkem Carbon and Elkem Solar for a sales price of $2 billion. The deal excluded 85 percent of the hydroelectric power company Elkem Energi AS, which remained with Orkla.

In June 2017 Elkem assumed management responsibility of Xinghou Silicones, a silicones producer, and Yongdeng Silicon Materials, a silicon producer.

Elkem became publicly listed on the Oslo Stock Exchange in March 2018. Helge Aasen has been the Chief Executive Officer since 2021.

As of 31,12.2021, the China National BlueStar-controlled company Bluestar Elkem Int.Co.LTD S.A is Elkem's largest shareholder, with 52.91 per cent of the shares, ahead of Folketrygdfondet (4.59 per cent) and Alfred Berg Kapitalforvaltning (3.51 per cent)

Operations

Silicones
The Elkem Silicones division has thirteen plants: Xinghuo Silicones (China), Roussillon (France), Saint-Fons (France), Caronno (Italy), Lubeck (Germany), Santa Perpetua (Spain), Joinville (Brazil), York (USA), Janghang (South Korea), Chakan (India), Guangdong and Shanghai (China).

Silicon products
Elkem Silicon Products has silicon plants at Bremanger, Salten, Bjølvefossen and Thamshavn in Norway, Chicoutimi (Quebec, Canada), Grundartangi (Iceland), Limpio (Paraguay), Nagpur (India) and at Elkem Foundry China (EFC) and Yongdeng. The division also has a special focus on raw materials sourcing and are operating two quartz mines in Norway, Tana and Mårnes, and four quartz mines in Spain, Explotacion de Rocas Industriales y Minerals SA (Erimsa).

Carbon products
Elkem Carbon Solutions is the world’s largest producer of electrically calcined anthracite and electrode paste, which are necessary in the manufacturing process for steel, aluminium, silicon, ferrosilicon and other metals. There are production plants at Kristiansand (Norway), Shizuishan City (China), Ferroveld (South Africa), Sarawak (Malaysia) and Vitória (Brazil).

See also
 Elkem Thamshavn

References 

Chemical companies established in 1904
1904 establishments in Norway
Meråker
Orkla ASA
Silicon wafer producers
Aluminium companies of Norway
ChemChina
Companies listed on the Oslo Stock Exchange
Norwegian brands